Frances Dorsey is a former American ice skater who, during the 1950s, competed at both national and international levels and subsequently had a career with the Ice Follies.

Competition
She competed in the U.S. National Championships, placing 2nd in 1952 and 3rd in 1954.
Competing twice in the World Championships during the same period, she placed 11th in 1951 and 5th in 1954.

Later life
Dorsey became a teacher and ice show choreographer at the Northbrook Ice Arena in Northbrook, Illinois.  She subsequently retired with her husband to Santa Fe, New Mexico. She died on July 10, 2010. She was a member of the Santa Fe Figure Skating club and was a truly amazing coach. All of the skaters appreciated her unique touch that she brought to the ice. She was always in a positive mood and willing to help all the girls with their programs.
.  She grew up skating with her younger sister Sherry Dorsey Cook never far behind her in competitive circles.  They were known as "The Dorsey Sisters."  When she was a star in Ice Follies, Frances was billed as, "The Marilyn Monroe of The Ice."

Besides skating in Ice Follies, she continued to perform ub sycg productions as Holiday on Ice, America on Ice, and authored the book, Creative Ice Skating.

As an adult, she would wake up at 4:30 am each morning doing stretches for 1 & 1/2 hours before going to the ice rink to teach skating in full makeup, and wearing stylish clothes.

"More" magazine chose her as one of the 20 most physically fit cancer survivors in the United States.

While living in Santa Fe, she became interested in horsemanship, and learned dressage riding.

References

American female single skaters
Living people
Year of birth missing (living people)
Place of birth missing (living people)
21st-century American women